Twinning institutional building tool was launched in May 1998. Twinning is one of the principal tools of Institution Building accession assistance. Twinning aims to help beneficiary countries in the development of modern and efficient administrations, with the structures, human resources and management skills needed to implement the acquis communautaire to the same standards as Member States. Twinning provides the framework for administrations and semi-public organisations in the beneficiary countries to work with their counterparts in Member States. Together they develop and implement a project that targets the transposition, enforcement and implementation of a specific part of the acquis communautaire.

The main distinct feature of the Twinning project is direct exchange of specific national experience in EU legislation implementation.

Not similar to other technical assistance, a Twinning project is that it sets out to deliver specific and guaranteed results and not to foster general cooperation. The parties agree in advance on a detailed work programme to meet an objective concerning priority areas of the acquis.

The key input from administrations of EU Member States to effect longer-term change is in the core team of long-term seconded EU experts, practitioners in the implementation of the acquis, to administrations of new Member States, acceding, candidate or potential candidate country. The proposed experts should be seconded from public institutions in the Member State and not be private consultants. Once a Call for Proposals is launched, Member States create and submit their project proposals, sometimes forming consortiums with other Member States (Lead and Junior Partners). The target country then selects some of these Member States and invites them to present their proposal in person. The potential Resident Twinning Adviser (RTA) and Project Leader (PL) are expected to attend this presentation. Based on the presentation and the proposal, the country with the best bid is selected. Each country has an appointed "National Contact Point" to coordinate its activities in Twinning.

Each Twinning project has at least one Resident Twinning Adviser (RTA) and a Project Leader. The RTA is seconded from a Member State public administration or from another mandated body in a Member State to work full time for a minimum of 12 months in the corresponding ministry in partner country to implement the project. The Project Leader is responsible for the overall thrust and coordination of the project. They are supplemented by carefully planned and timed missions of other specialists, training events, awareness raising visits, etc. to accompany the reform process towards the targeted results.

The Twinning project cycle is more demanding in terms of preparation and a specific competitive selection procedure is used for selection and evaluation of the potential MS partners.

Policy Advice (incl. law drafting, advice on organisational issues, awareness raising, etc.), training, study tours and internships are among the activities eligible for Twinning projects. These activities, together with eligible costs for the Twinning project implementation and all relevant procedures are described in the Twinning Reference Manual.

Twinning may be implemented as classic Twinning (up to 24 months) and light Twinning (up to 6 months), with budget up to 2 mln euros.

Mutual benefits of Twinning for counterparts:

1. Exchange of experiences and knowledge based on equal-level communication between twinning partners (civil servant to civil servant);

2. Implementation of best practices of EU member State public administration;

3. Complementarity in the case of a consortium;

4. Alignment with current European legislation;

5. Knowledge of political administrative systems;

6. Long-term and structural working-relationships, professional networking, and, therefore, influencing attitude towards a beneficiary country in the EU;

7. Training and improving professional capacity;

8. Development and implementation of adapted legislation which is necessary for fulfilment of the obligations on joint Agreements and Action Plans, and for integrating into the European  markets;

9. Changes in organisational practices and culture, improvements in managerial styles, better communication and co-ordination between and within Beneficiary Administrations are valuable bi-products of the process of MS civil servants working closely alongside BA counterparts.

See also
http://ec.europa.eu/enlargement/tenders/twinning/index_en.htm
Portal of Twinning instrument in Ukraine
Center for Adaptation of Civil Service to the Standards of EU - public institution established by the Decree of Cabinet of Ministers of Ukraine to facilitate administrative reform in Ukraine and to enhance the adaptation of the civil service to the standards of the European Union.

Enlargement of the European Union